Who is to Blame? is a novel by Alexander Herzen.

History
Who is to Blame? was first published in the journal Otechestvennye Zapiski (1845-1846), with some cuts by the censor. It was published in book form in 1847. It was the first purely "social" novel in Russian literature. Vissarion Belinsky remarked that the novel was artistically weak but was valuable as a social and psychological evaluation of contemporary Russian life.

Plot
In part one Dmitry Krutsifersky, the poor son of a provincial doctor, is hired to tutor the son of the rich landowner Negrov. Krutsifersky eventually marries Negrov's illegitimate daughter Lyubov. In part two Krutsifersky and Lyubov are happily married with a child. Their happiness is destroyed when a rich young landowner named Beltov becomes a friend of the family and begins an illicit relationship with Lyubov. Beltov ends up departing Russia for Europe, leaving the young couple with a broken and hopeless marriage.

Part one is a satire of the Russian landed gentry, showing their coarseness and pettiness. Part two introduces the type of the "superfluous man" in the person of Beltov.

English translations
 Who is to Blame? : A Novel in Two Parts, Translated by Margaret Wettlin, Progress Publishers, Moscow, 1978
Who Is to Blame?: A Novel in Two Parts, Translated by Michael R. Katz, Cornell University Press, 1984.

References

1846 Russian novels
Novels set in Russia
Works originally published in Russian magazines